The following is a chronological list of classical music composers living and working in Scotland, or originating from Scotland.

Renaissance

Baroque

Classical era

Romantic

Modern/Contemporary

See also 
 Classical music of the United Kingdom

References 

Scottish